Mohammad Reza Aslani(born December 9, 1943, in Rasht, Iran) is an Iranian filmmaker, art theorist, graphic designer and poet known mostly for his experimental films and documentaries. He is also the co-writer of Espacementalism manifesto—although he never signed the manifesto—and one of the main poets of the New Wave Poetry of Iran alongside Yadollah Royaee, Fereydoun Rahnema and Ahmadreza Ahmadi.

Personal life 
Mohammad Reza Aslani studied Painting at the University of Art. He graduated with a graduate diploma in Filmmaking with specialization in Production Design through the Iran Broadcasting University under Mostafa Farzaneh. He is married to Soudabeh Fazaeli, a novelist and researcher. They have a son Amin who is also a filmmaker and two daughters Gita and Narges.

Career

Poetry 
Mohammad Reza Aslani started off his career as a poet before becoming a renowned as a filmmaker. He and his wife, Soudabeh Fazaeli mostly recognize themselves as participants of a particular literary movement called Alternative Poem (She'er-e-Digar) and Alternative Prose (Nathr-e-Digar). Some of the important figures of this movement includes Bijan Elahi, Yadollah Royaee, Bahram Ardabili, and Hushang Irani. Some researchers including Esmaeel NooriAla believe his poetry is influential through the New Wave Poetry of Iran.

In 1962, Mohammad Reza Aslani and some of his classmates in school of decorative arts such as published a book of poetry named Shabhâye Nimkati, Roozhây-e-Bâd (Bench-y Nights, Wind Days) which went viral through Iranian literary salons at the time and was considered as avant-garde future of the new wave poetry and also graphic design. He mentions that in school of decorative arts, instead of learning any classical form of painting, he directly started to learn modern architecture and art and their worldview towards the environment became his questions as well. His questions beside the questions of the Imagist in England or France was also what he called the plasticity of the image in poetry.

Although his style is sometimes similar to some of his contemporaries like Ahmadi or Farrokhzad, he believed that style of the artist forms around the essential needs and emotions of his soul. For the same reason his poetry does not have the musicality of Nima's poetry and also does not have the emotional variation and sentimentalism of the Ahmadi's poems as well. He brought everyday language to poetry, not like any other, and with a painting-like composition. 

Aslani later abandoned the New Wave Poetry into the New Wave Cinema. With his second book, Bar Tafâzol-e-Do Maghreb (On Differential of Two Occidents), he disappointed New Wave movement by revising his style and aesthetics and also in his third book, Soognâme-ye-Sâlha-ye-Mamnooe (Requiem of the Abandoned Years), he completely opposed his own style in his first book. As he mentions:

In 2019, his new historical-epic poem book called Hezâr Bâde-ye Hezâr Bâd dar Hezâreh-hâye Shab-e-Too-bar-Too (Thousand Wines of Thousand Wind in Millenary of Labyrinth-ed Night) got published after 49 years, since the SAVAK had taken it all away. According to an interview he had to rewrite the whole book of 200 pages based on 30 pages of draft he found in his archive. Many historical and mythological characters of Iranian culture like Rostam, Ayn al-Quzat Hamadani, Al-Hallaj, Bidel Dehlavi and Ya'qub ibn al-Layth al-Saffar are among the characters of this epopee. He wrote this book under the influence of Shahname.

Cinema

As student in school of decorative arts, he used to watch artistic films in Cinematheque of Tehran also known as Film Club (Kanoon-e-Film) with two of his friends and classmates Iraj Anvari and Edward Arshamian. After seeing an announcement poster for production designer recruitment course by Ministry of Arts and Culture, he decided to take the entrance exam for the course which was on the same day. He ended up getting accepted for the filmmaking course which took 9 months.

Later he got into the newly founded National Iranian Radio and Television as an art director and senior production designer. He also designed the logo for the Institution. Later he got introduced to Fereydoun Rahnema who was Television's content and research advisor at the time. After Rahnema proposed a program to Reza Ghotbi, the NIRT's head at the time about making experimental documentaries about different parts of Iran, Aslani alongside Basir Nasibi, Parviz Kimiavi, Hassanali Kowsar, Houshang Azadivar, Naser Taghvai and others started making films. Rahnema himself produced his first film Jaam-e-Hasanlou about the golden bowl of Hasanlu. The film consists of scenes from bowl's motifs while the narrator reads from Passion of Al-Hallaj of the Tazkirat al-Awliyā by Attar of Nishapur while the soundtrack consisted of Rappresentatione di Anima, et di Corpo by Emilio de' Cavalieri.

In the world of feature films, he made The Chess Game of the Wind in 1976 with the production of Bahman Farmanara. It took him 6 years to finance and finally make the movie. It was met with critical acclaim and audience apathy when it opened in Tehran in 1976 and also some controversies while screening the movie and after 1979 revolution towards archiving it made it tough for the movie to come out. The stunning period drama was prohibited by the Islamic Republic and thought to be lost until 2014.  In 2020, Scorsese Foundation restored the movie for Cannes 2020 to be shown in classics section of the festival. He also made The Green Fire in 2008 after years of not working. The film supposed to be shot in the Bam Citadel but after 2003 Bam earthquake and complete destruction of the citadel, the project got delayed. Later he made the movie in a citadel near Kerman. The movie consists of different narratives in different timelines narrating an old Iranian tale called Sang-e-Sabour.

Publications 
During 1983-93 he and his wife founded a publication called Nashr-e-Noghreh. It introduced different style of book design and publishing for its time. Nashr-e-Noghre got closed after its office caught in fire because they have published Women without Men by Shahrnoush Parsipur. In 2020, the publication received necessary permissions to republish once again, and re-opened its new generation of publication.

Books

Poem
 Shabhâye Nimkati, Roozhây-e-Bâd (Bench-y Nights, Wind Days), 1962, Re-published 2022
 Bar Tafâzol-e-Do Maghreb (On Differential of Two Occidents), 1972
 Soognâme-ye-Sâlha-ye-Mamnoo'e (Requiem of the Abandoned Years), 1979
 Hezâr Bâde-ye Hezâr Bâd dar Hezâreh-hâye Shab-e-Too-bar-Too (Thousand Wines of Thousand Wind in Millenary of Labyrinth-ed Night), 2019

Theoretical and Interview
 Degarkhâni-e Cinema-ye Mostanad (Alternative Reading on Documentary Cinema), 1999–2010, Publication: 2010
 Hasti-ye Ayineh (The Being of the Mirror), 2018, Interviews with Arash Sanjabi 
 Binesh-e-Tasviri dar Iran (Vision of the Image in Iran), Not yet published.

Filmography

Documentaries 
 Mash Esmaeil (1972)
 Koodak-e-Emrooz (Nowadays Child) (1978)
 Ghali va Estethmar (Carpet and Exploitation of Labour) (1979)
 Koodak va Estethmar (Child and Exploitation of Labour) (1982)

Experimental and Experimental Documentaries 
 Jaam-e-Hasanlou (Golden bowl of Hasanlu) (1964)
 Ghorbat-ol-Gharbia (Occidental Exile) (1967)
 Jaame-e-Fahraj (Congregation of Fahraj) (1968)
 Tarikhaneh (1968)
 Abu Rayhan (1973)
 Chigh (1996)
 Khaterat-e-Yek Haftad-o-Panj Sale (Memoirs of a 75 Years Old) (2007)
 Dast-hay-e-Hegmataaneh (The Hands of the Ecbatana) (2010)
 Che Aftaab-e-Khoshi Darun-e-Oo Mitaft (Such a Pleasant Sunshine was Glowing in Him) (2012)
 Tehran, Honar-e-Mafhoumi (Tehran, Conceptual Art) (2012)
 Jaam-e-Hasanlou: 50 Saal Ba'ad (Golden bowl of Hasanlu: 50 Years Later) (2016)
 Khaaneh-yi bar vosa'at-e Aagaahi (A House as Wide as Consciousness) (2018)

Feature films 
 Shatranj-e-Baad (The Chess Game of The Wind) (1976)
 Atash-e-Sabz (The Green Fire) (2008)

Short films 
 Bad Badeh (1970)
 Chenin Konand Hekayat (Thus they say...) (1977)

TV series 
 Samak-e-Ayyar (Samak the Knight Errant) (1974–75)
 Ghobaar-e-Nour (Dust of the Light) (1997–98)
 Mantegh-ot-Tayr (The Conference of the Birds) (1999)

As Screenwriter 
 Soozanbaan (Switchman) (1968) Dir. Manouchehr Tayyab
 Soo-ye Shahr-e Khamoush (Onto Silent City) (1969) Dir. Manouchehr Tayyab
 Sobh-e Rooz-e Chaharom (Fourth Day's Morning) (1972) Dir. Kamran Shirdel
 Mogholha (Mongols) (1973) Dir. Parviz Kimiavi
 Tangna (Strait) (1973) Dir. Amir Naderi
 Marsieh (Requiem) (1975) Dir. Amir Naderi
 Bagh-e Sangui (The Stone Garden) (1976) Dir. Parviz Kimiavi
 Ganj-e Ravaan (Flowing Treasure) (2012) Dir. Amin Aslani
 Baad bar Bagh-e Nazar (Wind on the Watching Garden) (2014) Dir. Pouyan Kazemi
 Derakht-e Banafsh (The Purple Tree) (2019) Dir. Amin Aslani

Awards and Recognition

 In 2015, Aslani received a certificate of First Order Artistic Badge of Ph.D. equivalent from the Ministry of Culture and Islamic Guidance and Iranian Academy of the Arts.

Notes

External links
 
 
 Chess of the Wind movie review
 Chess of the Wind Resurfacing
 The New York Times movie review

1943 births
Iranian film directors
Iranian literary critics
Iranian writers
Living people
People from Rasht